Centum station (formerly Suyeong station) is a railway station operated by Korail on the Donghae Line in U-dong, Haeundae District, Busan, South Korea. The former station name is unrelated to the station of the same name of the Busan Metro. Suyeong station was renamed to Centum station on December 30, 2016. It is also served by Mugunghwa-ho on the Donghae Line.

Station layout

References

Haeundae District
Korail stations
Railway stations in Busan
Railway stations opened in 1935